Sergei Petrovich Nikonenko (born 16 April 1941 in Moscow) is a Soviet and Russian actor, film director and screenwriter. People's Artist of the RSFSR (1991).

He performed in more than eighty films since 1961.

Selected filmography
 1967  
 The Red and the White (Звёзды и солдаты) as Cossack Officer
 The Journalist (Журналист) as Reutov
 1969 White Explosion (Белый взрыв) as Kolya Spichkin
 1970 Crime and Punishment (Преступление и наказание) as Nikolai
 1972 Liberation (Освобождение) as Sashka Golubev 
 1973 The Sky Is Beyond the Clouds (За облаками — небо)
 1974 Birds over the City (Птицы над городом) as Vishnyakov
 1977 An Unfinished Piece for Mechanical Piano (Неоконченная пьеса для механического пианино) as Yashka, the footman 
 1978 Father Sergius (Отец Сергий) as episode
 1979 The Theme (Тема) as Sinitsyn
 1980 Do Not Part with Your Beloved (С любимыми не расставайтесь) as Shumilov
 1981 Gipsy Happiness 1984 Planet Parade (Парад планет) as Vasily Afonin
 1985 Winter Evening in Gagra (Зимний вечер в Гаграх) as Valentin Fomenko, choreographer
 1987
 Tomorrow Was the War (Завтра была война) as school director
 Lilac Ball (Лиловый шар) as Horse-eater
 1988 Tree Sticks! (Ёлки-палки!) as Nikolai Nikolayevich Knyazev
 1989
 Stalingrad (Сталинград) as General Aleksandr Rodimtsev
 The Feasts of Belshazzar, or a Night with Stalin (Пиры Валтасара, или Ночь со Сталиным) as Kliment Voroshilov 
 1991 Viva Gardes-Marines! (Виват, гардемарины!) as Count Piotr Grigoryevich Chernyshev
 1992 Encore, Once More Encore! (Анкор, еще анкор!) as Ivan Kryukov
 1994 The Master and Margarita (Мастер и Маргарита) as Stepan Bogdanovich Likhodeev
 1998 Composition for Victory Day (Сочинение ко Дню Победы) as Nechiporenko
 1998 Classic (Классик) as Gorsky 
 2003 And in the Morning They Woke Up (А поутру они проснулись)
 2005 The Fall of the Empire (Гибель империи) as Paul von Rennenkampf 
 2006 Soviet Park (Парк советского периода) as Divisional Commander Chapayev
 2009 Attack on Leningrad (Ленинград) as captain of artillery
 2010 What Men Talk About (О чём говорят мужчины) as captain of the ship
 2018 The Crimean Bridge. Made with Love! (Крымский мост. Сделано с любовью!) as Talib Nazirovich
 2021 The Crying Steppe'' as Filipp Goloshchyokin

Honours and awards
 Order of the Badge of Honour (1971)
 Honored Artist of the RSFSR (1974)
 Lenin Komsomol Prize (1976) – the incarnation of images in contemporary cinema
 People's Artist of the RSFSR (1991) – for his contribution in the development of Soviet cinema
 Prize at the Constellation / Sozvezdie film festival in Tver (1999) for the best male lead in "Classic"
 Order "For Merit to the Fatherland", 4th class (2001) – for outstanding contribution to the development of national cinema
 Main prize of the International Short Film Festival Oberhausen for the best diploma director's work - the movie "Petruhina name"
 International literary award named after Sergei Yesenin "On Russia, wave your wings ..." in the "Film, Theatre, Television" (2010)
 Order of Honour (2011) – for outstanding contribution to the development of national cinema
 Order of Alexander Nevsky (2017) – for great contribution to the development of national culture and art, media, and many years of fruitful activity
 Stanislavsky Award (2021) – for conquering the heights of acting and loyalty to the principles of the school of K. S. Stanislavski

References

External links

1941 births
20th-century Russian male actors
20th-century Russian screenwriters
21st-century Russian male actors
21st-century Russian screenwriters
Living people
Male actors from Moscow
Gerasimov Institute of Cinematography alumni
Honored Artists of the RSFSR
People's Artists of the RSFSR
Recipients of the Lenin Komsomol Prize
Recipients of the Order "For Merit to the Fatherland", 4th class
Recipients of the Order of Alexander Nevsky
Recipients of the Order of Honour (Russia)
Russian film directors
Russian male film actors

Russian male stage actors
Russian screenwriters
Russian television presenters
Soviet film directors
Soviet male film actors
Soviet male stage actors
Soviet screenwriters
United Russia politicians